Crush is a 2009 Australian supernatural thriller film directed by Jeffrey Gerritsen and John V. Soto. It stars Christopher Egan as Julian, an American martial arts champ house sitting a luxury home in Perth. Julian's life unravels when he cheats on his girlfriend, Clare (Brooke Harman) with Anna (Emma Lung). It was released in Australia in April 2009. It was released on DVD in North America on 14 July 2010.

Plot
An international architecture student at University of Western Australia and martial arts champ, Julian finds work as a house sitter for the wealthy owners of a luxury home in Perth. His new job causes friction with his girlfriend Clare, who he was supposed to live with. The house and wealth it exudes open up a realm of opportunities for Julian, and he is seduced by the mysterious and attractive Anna. As time goes on, Anna becomes obsessive of Julian. Subsequently, his relationship with Clare falls apart, and he struggles to regain momentum in a martial arts championship. His academic life is threatened when his final university assignment disappears. When he speaks to the owner of the house, he mentions meeting the niece but is told that's impossible as she is away, and the name "Anna" gets a furious reaction. He asks a neighbour to shed some light on the conversation and it is revealed that a junkie died after getting into the house and falling down the stairs. He recognises Anna in the news photo. When she returns, he acknowledges that she is a ghost; her beautiful form turns into a monstrous banshee and tries to force him to kill himself so they can be together. Julian attempts to flee, but Anna traps him in the house, forcing him to hide. His friends and girlfriend come to check on him but are too late. Anna ambushes Julian and asks why he doesn't love her, in his last words he responds, "I'll never love you." just before the banshee pushes him down the stairs to his death, just like her when she was alive. Julian recovers in a hospital bed where a nurse is attending him. As she asks him who he would like to see, Julian asks for Clare. The nurse replies that he's answered incorrectly, revealing the silhouetted nurse to be none other than Anna and Julian is in fact dead. As the film ends, Anna promises to "take care" of Clare whilst kissing Julian in the afterlife.

Cast

Production
The film was shot in Western Australia, primarily in Perth. The area offered financial incentives according to the producer. Filming locations included South Perth, Perry Lakes Reserve, University of Western Australia and West Perth.

Soundtrack
 "Waiting All Day" – Silverchair
 "Ordinary Life" – Kristen Barry
 "Vampire Racecourse" – The Sleepy Jackson
 "Cigarettes and Suitcases" – Something for Kate
 "Animal, I'm Carrying" – Ravior
 "Last Resort" – Papa Roach
 "Bodies" – Little Birdy
 "Crazy" – Cordrazine
 "Everything" – Shihad

Reception
The film received a generally positive reaction from Australian cinema magazine, Filmink. "Crush delivers most of what it sets out to do. A busy soundtrack enhances the experience (itself a rarity), while muscular production and the eye candy appeal of Egan and Lung (the film's biggest asset) push proceedings a notch or two above similar movies. [...] it's all handled with enough flair to make the popcorn experience worthwhile."

See also
 Cinema of Australia

References

External links
 
 

2009 films
2009 horror films
2009 fantasy films
2009 psychological thriller films
Australian horror thriller films
Australian erotic thriller films
2000s erotic thriller films
Films set in Western Australia
Films shot in Perth, Western Australia
2000s supernatural thriller films
Erotic fantasy films
Films about stalking
2000s ghost films
2000s English-language films
Films directed by John V. Soto